La FM is a Colombian news/talk/pop music radio station, founded in July 1996 by RCN Radio. Until the mid-2000s (decade), it was a news/talk/adult contemporary station.

In Bogotá, it replaced tropical station Rumba Estéreo in order to bring Julio Sánchez Cristo to host its then brand-new morning show from Caracol Radio's Caracol Estéreo. After Sánchez Cristo returned to Caracol, at the time owned by Spanish group PRISA, in 2003, television journalist Claudia Gurisatti became La FM presenter until 2007. Later came Vicky Dávila is the main host of the Noticiero de La FM, Hassan Nassar and in 2018, former CNN Anchor, Luis Carlos Velez became its host and news director

References

External links 
La FM

Radio stations in Colombia
1996 establishments in Colombia
Radio stations established in 1996
Mass media in Bogotá